Mont Orchez (1,347 m) is a mountain in the Chablais Alps in Haute-Savoie, France.

References

Mountains of the Alps
Mountains of Haute-Savoie